Sergey Nikolayevich Volkov (19 April 1949  – 31 August 1990) was a Soviet figure skater. He won the 1975 World title and placed second in 1974.

Personal life 
Volkov was born on 19 April 1949 in Moscow. He was the brother of Elena Buriak, an international skating referee. With his first wife, Lyudmila, he had a son, Aleksandr, and with his second wife, Oksana, he had twin daughters, Ekaterina and Anastasia. He died from stomach cancer on 31 August 1990 in Kharkiv and was buried in Kuntsevo Cemetery in Moscow.

Volkov dreamed of becoming a pilot and twice tried to enter the flight academy in Rostov-on-Don. He failed the medical test both times because of his soft and weak knees and ankles, which would fail upon landing after a parachute jump. For the same reason he struggled with landing his jumps throughout his skating career.

Career 
Volkov debuted at the 1968 European Championship, and placed 12th. In 1974, he won the silver medal at the European and World Championships. Volkov won the individual world title in 1975, becoming the first Soviet man to do so. Domestically he won two Soviet titles, in 1974 and 1976.

Volkov participated in eight European and four World Championships. He was unbeatable in special and compulsory figures. After retiring from competition he worked as a figure skating coach, and spent four months in Austria in 1990 in this capacity.

Results

References

Navigation 

Russian male single skaters
Soviet male single skaters
1949 births
1990 deaths
Olympic figure skaters of the Soviet Union
Figure skaters at the 1976 Winter Olympics
Deaths from stomach cancer
World Figure Skating Championships medalists
European Figure Skating Championships medalists
Universiade medalists in figure skating
Figure skaters from Moscow
Universiade bronze medalists for the Soviet Union
Competitors at the 1970 Winter Universiade
Deaths from cancer in the Soviet Union
Deaths from cancer in Ukraine